Webbia may refer to:

 Hypericum sect. Webbia, the taxonomic section Webbia within the genus Hypericum
 Webbia (journal), a scientific journal published by the University of Florence
 Webbia (beetle), an ambrosia beetle genus in the tribe Xyleborini